Tou or TOU may refer to:
 Tactical Operations Unit, a type of police unit
 Terms of use, rules which one must agree to abide by in order to use a service
 Time-of-use, time-based pricing often used by utility companies
 Touho Airport (IATA airport code), Touho, New Caledonia
 Tou (biblical figure)
 Tou (brewery), a former Norwegian brewery
 Tou (surname), a surname in Chinese and other cultures
 Tou (tree) (Cordia subcordata)